Friedrich "Fritz" Febel (November 3, 1909 – September 21, 1969) was a German-American college football player and coach. He served as the head football coach at the University of Buffalo from 1952 to 1954, compiling a record of 4–19–1. Febel was an assistant football coach at Buffalo from 1936 to 1942. In 1946 he became an assistant professor of health, physical education, and recreations at the school.

Febel was born into an ethnic German family in Crvenka, Yugoslavia (now Serbia) and immigrated to the United States when he was 12. He became an all-star player for Lindblom High School in Chicago and Purdue University. In January 1935, he graduated from Purdue University with a B. S. degree. He died at Millard Fillmore Hospital in Buffalo, New York after suffering a heart attack.

Head coaching record

References

1909 births
1969 deaths
American football guards
Buffalo Bulls football coaches
Purdue Boilermakers football players
University at Buffalo faculty
Yugoslav emigrants to the United States
People from Crvenka
American people of German descent
Robert Lindblom Math & Science Academy alumni